Elachista brachyelythrifoliella is a moth of the family Elachistidae. It is found in the United States, where it has been recorded from Alabama, California, Florida, Indiana, Kentucky, Mississippi, Ohio, Pennsylvania, Virginia and Washington.

The wingspan is 5.5-7.5 mm. The basal third of the forewings is gray, shading to dark blackish brown outwardly. A white line follows the costal margin from near the base of the costa, diverging from the costa as a short streak ending just within the dark brown portion of the wing. There is a pair of silvery white spots just beyond the middle. The hindwings are dark brownish gray. Adults have been recorded on wing nearly year round.

The larvae feed on Brachyelytrum aristatum and Muhlenbergia species. They mine the leaves of their host plant. The mine starts as a fine linear gallery, often following the margin of the leaf. It later becomes an elongate blotch. Sometimes a second mine is made. Mining larvae can be found from early July to October. Pupation takes place in a crevice beneath two layers of silk.

References

brachyelythrifoliella
Moths described in 1864
Moths of North America